Joshua Rice (born July 8, 1987) is an American rugby league footballer and former college footballer. Redshirted in 2005, Rice played as an linebacker for the Hawaii Warriors football team between 2006 and 2009. He switched to rugby league and earned selection for the United States national team between 2011 and 2017. He most notably appeared at the 2017 Rugby League World Cup.

Early life
Rice was born in Honolulu, Hawaii, and attended Coronado High School in Nevada. His maternal grandfather is David W. Chappell.

References

External links
Hawaii Warriors football profile
2017 RLWC profile

1987 births
Living people
American football linebackers
American sportspeople of Canadian descent
American rugby league players
Footballers who switched code
Hawaii Rainbow Warriors football players
Ipswich Jets players
New York Knights players
Players of American football from Nevada
Rugby league centres
Rugby league second-rows
Sportspeople from Las Vegas
United States national rugby league team players